Goran Peric is a Croatian retired footballer who played as a forward.

Career 
Peric played in the National Soccer League in 1972 with Toronto Croatia. In his debut season with Croatia he assisted in securing the Canadian Open Cup by defeating Vancouver Columbus. He re-signed with Croatia for the 1973 season, and assisted Toronto by defending their Canadian Open Cup by defeating West Indies United with a hattrick. He returned for a third stint with Croatia for the 1974 season. In 1975, he played in the North American Soccer League with Toronto Metros-Croatia. In his debut season in the NASL he made ten appearances and scored one goal.

References 
 

Year of birth missing (living people)
Living people
Association football forwards
Yugoslav footballers
Toronto Croatia players
Toronto Blizzard (1971–1984) players
Canadian National Soccer League players
North American Soccer League (1968–1984) players
Yugoslav expatriate footballers
Expatriate soccer players in Canada
Yugoslav expatriate sportspeople in Canada